At Mlikec is a town and commune in northern Algeria.

Communes of Béjaïa Province